Heleri Saar  (born 16 November 1979) is an Estonian footballer, playing as a defender. She was a member of the Estonia women's national football team from 1996–2021, playing 66 matches.

Personal life
She has a son, Ricardo.

References

External links
 
 
 

1979 births
Living people
Estonian women's footballers
Estonia women's international footballers
Sportspeople from Pärnu
Women's association football defenders
Pärnu JK players